Giota Lydia (Yiota Lydia)( )( Panagiota Mandaraki(), 24 February 1934 in Nea Ionia, Greece) is a Greek Laïko singer.

References

1934 births
Greek laïko singers
Smyrniote Greeks
Living people
Musicians from İzmir